Jamie Fraser (born November 17, 1985) is a Canadian former professional ice hockey defenceman who played one game in the National Hockey League (NHL) with the New York Islanders.

Playing career
Undrafted from the Ontario Hockey League, Fraser signed with the New York Islanders in 2006. After playing a single NHL game with the Islanders in the 2008–09 season, on July 8, 2009, Fraser was signed to a one-year contract with the Minnesota Wild. Assigned to the Wild's American Hockey League affiliate, the Houston Aeros, Fraser finished the 2009–10 season third among Aeros defenseman with 22 points and set a career high with 16 assists.

On July 6, 2010, Fraser was re-signed by the Wild to a one-year contract.

On June 15, 2011, Fraser signed a one-year contract with Slovenian-based team, HDD Olimpija Ljubljana, of the Austrian Erste Bank Hockey Liga. Fraser played a single season with HDD in the 2011–12 season, posting a then professional high 32 points in 49 games before moving to fellow EBEL club, the Vienna Capitals on a multi-year contract on April 25, 2012.

Fraser played six seasons with the Capitals, leaving following the 2017–18 season to sign a contract with his third EBEL club, EC VSV, on May 22, 2018.

Following his fourth season with VSV in 2021–22, Fraser ended his 17-year professional career on April 4, 2022.

Career statistics

See also
List of players who played only one game in the NHL

References

External links
 

1985 births
Brampton Battalion players
Bridgeport Sound Tigers players
Elmira Jackals (ECHL) players
HDD Olimpija Ljubljana players
Houston Aeros (1994–2013) players
Ice hockey people from Ontario
Living people
New York Islanders players
Sarnia Sting players
South Carolina Stingrays players
Sportspeople from Sarnia
Syracuse Crunch players
Undrafted National Hockey League players
Vienna Capitals players
EC VSV players
Canadian expatriate ice hockey players in Austria
Canadian expatriate ice hockey players in Slovenia
Canadian expatriate ice hockey players in the United States
Canadian ice hockey defencemen